The LeClaire Apartments is a historic apartment building in Tampa, Florida, United States. It is located at 3013 through 3015 San Carlos Street. It was designed by Tampa architect Fred J. James. On November 16, 1988, it was added to the U.S. National Register of Historic Places.

See also
El Centro Español of West Tampa
Old Tampa Free Public Library

References and external links
 Hillsborough County listings at National Register of Historic Places
 Hillsborough County listings at Florida's Office of Cultural and Historical Programs

Gallery

References

Buildings and structures in Tampa, Florida
National Register of Historic Places in Tampa, Florida
Apartment buildings in Florida
Residential buildings on the National Register of Historic Places in Florida
1926 establishments in Florida